In mathematics, the monopole moduli space is a space parametrizing monopoles (solutions of the Bogomolny equations).   studied the moduli space for 2 monopoles in detail and used it to describe the scattering of monopoles.

See also
 Hitchin system

References

Differential geometry